Pott Row is an expanding village near King's Lynn, Norfolk. It is the western part of the civil and ecclesiastical Parish of Grimston.

Pott Row and neighbouring Grimston were quite significant centres of pottery production from the 11th to 16th centuries and important suppliers of this to Scandinavia.  Pots often had faces carved just under the rim.  Some of these can be seen in local Museums including the Castle Museum, Norwich.

External links

Villages in Norfolk
Ceramics of medieval England
King's Lynn and West Norfolk